NGC 2442 and NGC 2443 are two parts of a single intermediate spiral galaxy, commonly known as the  Meathook Galaxy or the Cobra and Mouse.  It is about 50 million light-years away in the constellation Volans. It was discovered by Sir John Herschel on December 23, 1834 during his survey of southern skies with a 18.25 inch diameter reflecting telescope (his "20-foot telescope") from an observatory he set up in Cape Town, South Africa. Associated with this galaxy is HIPASS J0731-69, a cloud of gas devoid of any stars. It is likely that the cloud was torn loose from NGC 2442 by a companion.

When John Louis Emil Dreyer compiled the New General Catalogue of Nebulae and Clusters of Stars he used  William Herschel's earlier observations that described two objects in a "double nebula", giving the northern most the designation NGC 2443 and the southernmost most the designation NGC 2442. Herschel's later observations noted that the two objects were actually a single large nebula.  

Gaia16cfr was a supernova imposter that occurred in NGC 2442 on 1 December 2016.  It reached a Gaia apparent magnitude of 19.3 and absolute magnitude of about −12.

References

External links 

 NGC 2442 in Volans
Astronomy Picture of the Day
NGC 2442: Galaxy in Volans 2007 March 15
 NGC 2442: Galaxy in Volans 2010 March 25 - from Hubble Space Telescope data
 NGC 2442: Galaxy in Volans 2017 August 17- from Hubble Space Telescope and European Southern Observatory data
 

Peculiar galaxies
Intermediate spiral galaxies
Volans (constellation)
2442
21373